Garden East is a neighborhood in Karachi East district of Karachi, Pakistan. It is administered as part of Jamshed Town, which was disbanded in 2011 but later restored in early 2022. 

This area surrounds the Karachi Zoological Gardens (former name Gandhi Garden) hence it is popularly known as Gardens.

The area has a large presence of Ismailis due to their Jama'at Khana (or prayer hall) being located there.

The area was predominantly residential but over the last few years, smaller commercial areas have grown to cater needs of residents.

Many Restaurants can be found in Big Bite area of the neighborhood.

Cincinnatus Town was developed as a neighborhood for Christians in the 1930s. It was later absorbed into a larger settlement and named Garden East.

References

External links 
 .

Neighbourhoods of Karachi
Jamshed Town
Ismailism in Pakistan